= Avip =

Avip (Russian: Ави́п) is a Russian Christian male first name. The name is possibly derived from the Greek word aipos, meaning high or tall.
